Sokol (Falcon, Russian: Сокол) is the first russian rock band, the “legend” of Russian rock.

History 
The band was formed at the end of 1964 in Moscow on the initiative of the guitarist Yuri Ermakov. The band also included Igor Goncharuk, Vyacheslav Chernysh, Sergey Timashev. The first administrator of the group was Yuri Aizenshpis. The name is associated with the Moscow region Sokol, where the band members lived.

Like all early Soviet bands, the Sokol's repertoire was based on the works of Western rock and pop stars: Elvis Presley, Bill Haley, the Beatles. However, Ermakov and Goncharuk became the authors of the first rock song written in Russian ("Где тот край", 1965).

The first performance of the Sokol band took place on October 6, 1964 in Moscow in the Ekspromt cafe, then the group performed in various Moscow cafes and Houses of Culture. The group first began performing on the professional stage in 1966, when the ensemble was invited to work at the Tula Regional Philharmonic under the name "Silver Strings". They worked there for a little over a year, having managed to travel around the whole country with the program "Songs of the Nations of the World". Sokol left the Philharmonic at the end of 1967.

In 1968 Sokol recorded the song "Film, Film" for the animated film "Film, Film, Film", but the cartoon itself sounded the voices of singers from the Orpheus group. At the end of 1969, Sokol disbanded.

References

Literature 
 Alexander Alekseev. Who is Who in Russian Rock Music   
Yevgeny Dodolev.  Alexander Gradsky. The Voice 

Musical groups from Moscow
Russian rock music groups
Soviet rock music groups
Musical groups established in 1964
Musical groups disestablished in 1969